The Central District of Sirjan County is a district (bakhsh) in Sirjan County, Kerman Province, Iran. At the 2006 census, its population was 226,073, in 54,895 families.  The district has four cities: Sirjan, Balvard, Najaf Shahr, and Zeydabad. The district has eight rural districts (dehestan): Balvard Rural District, Chahar Gonbad Rural District, Golestan Rural District, Mahmudabad-e Seyyed Rural District, Malekabad Rural District, Najafabad Rural District, Sharifabad Rural District, and Zeydabad Rural District.

References 

Sirjan County
Districts of Kerman Province